Crosby Hall is situated in the ancient manor of Little Crosby, formerly in Lancashire. Close to the city of Liverpool in the modern county of Merseyside, it is a Grade II* listed building.

The existing hall was constructed circa 1785 in place of the previous Elizabethan manor house, some of which still remains. Almost square in layout it is a three-storey structure built of sandstone ashlar with a 3-span hipped roof of green slate.

History

Crosby Hall has been the manorial home of the Blundell family, lords of the manor of Crosby since the Middle Ages. Devoutly Catholic, Richard Blundell died in Lancaster Gaol in 1590 for his beliefs, where his son and daughter-in-law were also imprisoned for several years likewise for espousing Catholicism.

The family were Royalists during the Civil War, when the then squire, William Blundell, being severely injured at the Siege of Lancaster Castle was jailed with his family estates confiscated for ten years.

In 1838-39 William Blundell was High Sheriff of Lancashire and various members of this gentry family have been Knights of Malta. The present head of the family is Mark Blundell DL.

They are related to the staunchly Catholic Welds, from whom came Cardinal Weld and to the Weld-Blundells.

Modern use
Crosby Hall houses the Crosby Hall Education Trust (CHET), a registered charity, which was founded in 1988. CHET was opened by The Princess Margaret on 8 May 1991. Its current role is to offer outdoor activity to various youth groups, besides corporate sidelines such as weddings and conferences.

See also
Landed gentry
Listed buildings in Little Crosby
Nicholas Blundell
Blundellsands

References

Buildings and structures completed in 1609
Grade II* listed buildings in Liverpool